

Overview
The Cross Coupé GTE is a plug in hybrid with four wheel drive. The Cross Coupé GTE is the third concept car shown by Volkswagen Passenger Cars in the run up to the introduction of the production version.  

Together, all three concept cars – the CrossBlue presented in Detroit in January 2013, the seven seat CrossBlue Coupé shown in Los Angeles in November 2013, and the Cross Coupé GTE shown at the 2015 North American International Auto Show, it represents the versatility of using Volkswagen's MQB Platform, and is aimed at the market in the United States.

Specifications
The Volkswagen Cross Coupe GTE features gesture recognition which is almost identical to the Volkswagen Golf R Touch concept that was shown at the Consumer Electronics Show in Las Vegas, this system will come out in around five years. The Volkswagen Cross Coupe GTE's gas powered V6 engine and two electric motors produce a total of 355 horsepower and achieve an estimated 70 mpg-e. 

The Cross Coupe GTE can drive approximately twenty miles on electric power alone. Once the lithium ion battery pack is depleted, it can be recharged using the gasoline engine while driving, or by plugging it in. The gasoline engine only powers the front wheels. The rear wheels are driven by the electric motors.

Performance
The Volkswagen Cross Coupe GTE is powered by a 3.6 litre VR6 gasoline engine and two electric motors. The six cylinder direct injection engine produces 276 horsepower and 258 lb-ft. The two electric motors produce 54 hp and 162 lb ft (front) and 114 hp and 199 lb ft (rear). They are powered by a lithium-ion battery, it is rated at 14.1 kWh. 

The total output of the drive is 355 hp and 280 lb ft, this is enough to power the Cross Coupe GTE to a top speed of 130 mph and accelerate from 0–60 mph in 6.0 seconds.

References
http://www.autoblog.com/2015/01/11/volkswagen-cross-coupe-gte-detroit-official/

2015 Detroit Auto Show: Volkswagen Cross Coupe GTE: A Shape Of Things To Come

News Articles

http://media.vw.com/release/913/

All-wheel-drive vehicles
Cars introduced in 2015
Crossover sport utility vehicles
Luxury sport utility vehicles
Mid-size sport utility vehicles
Cross Coupe GTE Concept